Louk Sanders (born 9 May 1950) is a retired professional tennis player from the Netherlands.

Sanders was Holland's second best in the 1970s after Tom Okker. The right-hander reached his highest individual ranking on the ATP Tour on 31 December 1977, when he became the number 86 of the world. Sanders played for the Dutch Davis Cup team from 1974 to 1983. His best Grand Slam performance was reaching the third round of the French Open in 1979.

Career finals

Doubles (1 title, 1 runner-up)

External links

 
 
 

1950 births
Living people
Dutch male tennis players
People from Oegstgeest
Sportspeople from South Holland
20th-century Dutch people